The Suusamyr is a river in Jayyl District of Chüy Region of Kyrgyzstan. It forms the Kökömeren where it meets with Batysh Karakol. Starting at Ala-Bel Pass, it flows eastwards along Suusamyr Valley.

References

Rivers of Kyrgyzstan